Ephraim Randrianovona was the second Bishop of Antananarivo from 1976 to 1983. Randrianovana studied for the priesthood at St Paul's College in Madagascar and was ordained in 1945. He was Dean of the diocese's cathedral from 1973 to 1975.

References

External links 
 Cathédrale Saint Laurent Ambohimanoro

20th-century Anglican bishops in Africa
Anglican deans in Africa
Anglican bishops of Antananarivo
Year of birth missing
Possibly living people